Carina Jaarneks orkester was a dansband in the town of Ronneby, Sweden, scoring chart successes at Svensktoppen between the late 1980s and the early 2000s, with Carina Jaarnek acting as the band's singer. It was started in 1989. In 1991, the band won the first, unofficial, edition of the Swedish Dansband Championships contest. In the year 2000, the band participated in the finals of the Dansbandslåten contest with the song Minns du hur vi älskade which, however, didn't win the contest.

Discography

Albums 
Carina Jaarneks orkester (album) – 1989
Hela livet leker – 1994
Under alla dessa år – 1998
Carina Jaarneks live -99 – 1999
Live Collection – 1999

Singles 
Man lär så länge man lever/Jag önskar att jag kunde flyga – 1990
När hela livet leker/Sitter här i regnet – 1994
Ännu en dag – 1998
Du är det bästa för mig – 1999
En liten fågel – 1999

Svensktoppen songs 
Låt sommaren gunga dig – 1996
Under alla dessa år – 1999
Du är det bästa för mig – 1999
På väg (hem till dig) – 2000
Minns du hur vi älskade – 2000

Failed to enter chart 
När kärleken är ny – 1997
Mina ljusa barndomsminnen – 1998
Jag vill dela varje dag med dig – 1999
Ännu en dag – 1999 
Amore mio – 2000

References

Dansbands
Swedish musical groups